Saganthit Island (Sellore Island) is an island in the Mergui Archipelago, Burma (Myanmar). Its area is 257 km2.

References

External links
South Myanmar Islands

Mergui Archipelago